The New Zealand women's cricket team played the England women's cricket team in July 2018. The tour consisted of three Women's One Day Internationals (WODIs) which formed part of the 2017–20 ICC Women's Championship. Before the WODI matches, both teams played in a tri-series, with South Africa women being the third team. England Women won the three-match series 2–1.

Squads

WODI series

1st WODI

2nd WODI

3rd WODI

References

External links
 Series home at ESPN Cricinfo

2017–20 ICC Women's Championship
2018 in New Zealand cricket
International cricket competitions in 2018
New Zealand 20189
England 2018
cricket
2018 in English women's cricket
2018 in women's cricket